Justo San Miguel (5 July 1870 – 2 June 1947) was a Spanish polo player. He competed in the polo tournament at the 1924 Summer Olympics.

References

External links
 

1870 births
1947 deaths
Spanish polo players
Polo players at the 1924 Summer Olympics
Olympic polo players of Spain
Sportspeople from Granada